"Amarillo" is a double A-side single with "Revolving Doors" released by British alternative band Gorillaz from their iPad recorded album, The Fall. The word "amarillo" comes from Spanish and it translates to "yellow".

Background
"Amarillo" was recorded in Amarillo, Texas on 23 October 2010. The song features instrumentals from The Clash band member Mick Jones.

Personnel
Damon Albarn – vocals, synthesizer, vocoder, recording engineer
Mick Jones – guitar
Stephen Sedgwick – mixing engineer, recording engineer
Geoff Pesche – mastering engineer

Critical reception
NME gave the single a positive review saying "Amarillo is a slow, yet euphoric song that finds Damon's reverb-laden voice evocatively recalling America's vast great interior. One of the more fully formed songs on the album, you get a vivid portrait of a songwriter from the British Isles getting his mind around one of the world's largest open spaces."

References

2011 singles
Gorillaz songs
Songs written by Damon Albarn
2010 songs
Parlophone singles
Electronica songs